June Knox-Mawer, née Ellis (10 May 1930 in Wrexham, Wales – 19 April 2006) was a British writer of non-fiction books and romance novels and a radio broadcaster. In 1992, her novel Sandstorm won the Romantic Novel of the Year Award by the Romantic Novelists' Association.

Biography
Knox-Mawer was born June Ellis on 10 May 1930 in Wrexham, Wales, UK, daughter of Frank Ellis, an accountant, and was raised in rural Denbighshire. She worked on the Chester Chronicle. In 1951, she married Ronald Knox-Mawer (1925–2009), a barrister and member of the colonial judiciary; they had a son a and a daughter. The married couple lived in Arabia and Fiji, which inspired her writing. In 1972, they returned to the UK. She died on 19 April 2006, survived by her husband and children.

Bibliography

Non-fiction
The Sultans Came to Tea (1961)
A Gift of Islands: Living in Fiji  (1965)
A South Sea Spell (1975)
Tales from Paradise: Memories of the British in the South Pacific (1986)
A Ram in the Well: A Welsh Homecoming (2001)

Novels
 Marama (1972) aka Marama of the Islands
 Sandstorm (1992)
 The Shadow of Wings (1995)

References and sources

1930 births
2006 deaths
People from Wrexham
English romantic fiction writers
RoNA Award winners
20th-century English novelists
21st-century British writers
20th-century English women writers
21st-century English women writers
Women romantic fiction writers
English women novelists